Tris(ethylenediamine)cobalt(III) chloride is an inorganic compound with the formula [Co(en)3]Cl3 (where "en" is the abbreviation for ethylenediamine). It is the chloride salt of the coordination complex [Co(en)3]3+.  This trication was important in the history of coordination chemistry because of its stability and its stereochemistry.  Many different salts have been described.  The complex was first described by Alfred Werner who isolated this salt as yellow-gold needle-like crystals.

Synthesis and structure
The compound is prepared from an aqueous solution of ethylenediamine and virtually any cobalt(II) salt, such as cobalt(II) chloride.  The solution is purged with air to oxidize the cobalt(II)-ethylenediamine complexes to cobalt(III).  The reaction proceeds in 95% yield, and the trication can be isolated with a variety of anions.   A detailed product analysis of a large-scale synthesis revealed that one minor by-product was [Co(en)2Cl(H2NCH2CH2NH3)]Cl3, which contains a rare monodentate ethylenediamine ligand (protonated).

The cation [Co(en)3]3+ is octahedral with Co-N distances in the range 1.947–1.981 Å.  The N-Co-N angles are 85° within the chelate rings and 90° between nitrogen atoms on adjacent rings.

Stereochemistry

The point group of this complex is D3. The complex can be resolved into enantiomers that are described as Δ and Λ.  Usually the resolution entails use of tartrate salts. The optical resolution is a standard component of inorganic synthesis courses.  Because of its nonplanarity, the MN2C2 rings can adopt either of two conformations, which are described by the symbols λ and δ.  The registry between these ring conformations and the absolute configuration of the metal centers is described by the nomenclature lel (when the en backbone lies parallel with the C3 symmetry axis) or ob (when the en backbone is obverse to this same C3 axis).  Thus, the following diastereomeric conformations can be identified: Δ-(lel)3, Δ-(lel)2(ob), Δ-(lel)(ob)2, and Δ-(ob)3.  The mirror images of these species of course exist also.

Hydrates
Cationic coordination complexes of ammonia and alkyl amines typically crystallize with water in the lattice, and the stoichiometry can depend on the conditions of crystallization and, in the cases of chiral complexes, the optical purity of the cation. Racemic [Co(en)3]Cl3 is most often obtained as the di- or trihydrate.  For the optically pure salt (+)-[Co(en)3]Cl3·1.5H2O, (+)-[Co(en)3]Cl3·0.5NaCl·3H2O, and (+)-[Co(en)3]Cl3·H2O are also known.

References

Cobalt complexes
Cobalt(III) compounds
Chlorides
Metal halides
Ethylenediamine complexes